The Pulai River is a river in Johor, Malaysia. It runs from Mount Pulai in Kulai District until Tanjung Pelepas, draining into the Tebrau Straits. At its mouth lies the single largest seagrass bed in Malaysia, which extends all the way to Pulau Merambong. Sungai Pulai is also a mangrove forest reserve. The site is being studied to help managing the vast mangrove ecosystem, with assistance from University of Technology Malaysia and the National University of Malaysia, in line with the Integrated Management Plan for the sustainable use of mangroves in Johor.

Sungai Pulai is also a Ramsar site, one of the few locations in the world recognized as a wetland of international importance.

See also
 Geography of Malaysia

References

Further reading

Rivers of Johor
Ramsar sites in Malaysia